Sukhoy Donets is a rural locality (a selo) and the administrative center of Sukhodonetskoye Rural Settlement, Bogucharsky District, Voronezh Oblast, Russia. The population was 788 as of 2010. There are 12 streets.

Geography 
Sukhoy Donets is located 41 km southeast of Boguchar (the district's administrative centre) by road, on the Don River. Monastyrshchina is the nearest rural locality.

References 

Rural localities in Bogucharsky District